Atmosphere is the second album by Sevenglory. It was released on October 30, 2007 through 7Spin Music.

Track listing 
 "All You Want" (Fred Butson, Josh Parsons) – 2:28
 "All Of This For You" (Butson, Ian Eskelin, Douglas Kaine McKelvey) – 3:23
 "Just Me" (Butson, Brandon Heath, Gabe Johannes) – 3:16
 "Let It Be Love" (Butson, Eskelin, McKelvey) – 2:52
 "The Hope" (Butson) – 4:04
 "The Best Is Yet to Come" (Butson, Parsons) – 3:47
 "Even the Blues" (Butson, Don Chaffer) – 5:04
 "Atmosphere" (Butson) – 4:31
 "Lay It All Down" (Butson, Parsons) – 3:00
 "Show Me the Light" (Butson, Eskelin, Johannes) – 2:40

Personnel 

 Fred Butson – lead vocals, guitar
 Gabe Johannes – drums
 Caleb Johannes – bass
 Josh Parsons – guitar

References 

2007 albums
Sevenglory albums